Patrick Yazbek (born 5 April 2002) is an Australian professional soccer player who plays as a central midfielder for Eliteserien club Viking FK.

Early life 
Having begun playing soccer aged three, Yazbek joined Austral Soccer Club's under-5s. In 2010, he moved Football NSW's "Skill Acquisition Program". Yazbek then played for other youth teams, namely Club Marconi, Sydney United, Western Sydney Wanderers and Sydney FC.

Club career

Sydney FC
After making the bench a few times during the 2020–21 A-League season, Yazbek signed a two-year scholarship contract with Sydney FC in July 2021.

He made his senior debut in the 2021 FFA Cup round of 32, in a 4–2 victory over Sydney Olympic. Yazbek's A-League debut came on 12 December 2021, as a substitute in a 2–0 defeat to Central Coast Mariners. On 19 December, he made his starting debut for Sydney FC in a 2–1 win over Wellington Phoenix.

Viking FK
On 2 February 2023, Norwegian Eliteserien club Viking announced the signing of Yazbek.

International career 
Yazbek was selected for the Australia national under-23 team ahead of their qualifiers for the 2022 AFC U-23 Asian Cup. He played in both of Australia's games against Indonesia in October 2021, helping his side qualify for the final tournament. In the 2022 AFC U-23 Asian Cup, Yazbek played six games; Australia finished in fourth place, losing the third place match against Japan.

Style of play 
In 2021, Yazbek described himself as a "hardworking box-to-box midfielder".

Personal life 
Born in Australia, Yazbek is of Lebanese descent. Growing up a Sydney FC supporter, Yazbek studied at Holy Spirit Catholic Primary School in Carnes Hill, and at Clancy Catholic College in West Hoxton. As of 2021, he was a Construction Management student at the University of New South Wales.

Career statistics

Club

References

External links
 Patrick Yazbek at GameDay

2002 births
Living people
Soccer players from Sydney
Australian people of Lebanese descent
Sportspeople of Lebanese descent
Australian soccer players
Association football midfielders
Marconi Stallions FC players
Sydney United 58 FC players
Western Sydney Wanderers FC players
Sydney FC players
Viking FK players
National Premier Leagues players
A-League Men players
Australia youth international soccer players
University of New South Wales alumni
Australian expatriate soccer players
Expatriate footballers in Norway
Australian expatriate sportspeople in Norway